Tapirira bethanniana is a tall tree of the  family Anacardiaceae. It is endemic to tropical rainforests of French Guiana.

References

Endemic flora of French Guiana
Trees of French Guiana
bethanniana
Vulnerable plants
Taxonomy articles created by Polbot